Miles of Aisles is the first live album by Canadian singer-songwriter Joni Mitchell, released in 1974 on Asylum Records. It is a double album documenting her concerts in support of the Court and Spark album with her backing band for the tour, the L.A. Express. It reached No. 2 on the Billboard 200 and became one of her biggest-selling records, certified a gold record by the RIAA.

Content
This was Mitchell's first tour with backing musicians; prior to this she had generally performed solo, and had never organized a tour with a band. She hired an already existing group, the jazz fusion band L.A. Express, members of which had appeared on her previous studio album, Court and Spark, the biggest commercial success of her career. A track from this live album, "Big Yellow Taxi", was released as a single. Four years after the studio version had stalled at No. 67 on the Billboard Hot 100 as a single, this live version reached No. 24 on the Billboard Hot 100 charts, becoming Mitchell's fourth Top 40 hit single and third in a row.

The album contains many of her best-known songs up to that time, but only one track derived from her recent album and neither of its two hit singles, "Help Me" and "Free Man in Paris". It also includes two brand new songs "Love Or Money" and "Jericho" – the latter of which she would record a studio version of for her 1977 album Don Juan's Reckless Daughter. All tracks except two were recorded at the Universal Amphitheatre in Los Angeles, August 14 to 17, 1974. "Cactus Tree" was recorded at the Dorothy Chandler Pavilion on March 4, and "Real Good for Free" at the Berkeley Community Theater on March 2. The cover photo was taken at the Pine Knob Music Theater in Clarkston, Michigan.

Record World said of the single release of "Jericho" that it is "a solid musical successor to 'Big Yellow Taxi.'"

Track listing
All tracks are written by Joni Mitchell.

Side one
 "You Turn Me On, I'm a Radio" – 4:09
 "Big Yellow Taxi" – 3:09
 "Rainy Night House" – 4:04
 "Woodstock" – 4:29

Side two
 "Cactus Tree" – 5:01
 "Cold Blue Steel and Sweet Fire" – 5:23
 "Woman of Heart and Mind" – 3:40
 "A Case of You" – 4:42
 "Blue" – 2:49

Side three
 "The Circle Game" – 6:29
 "People's Parties" – 2:42
 "All I Want" – 3:21
 "Real Good for Free" – 4:27
 "Both Sides Now" – 4:14

Side four
 "Carey" – 3:30
 "The Last Time I Saw Richard" – 3:35
 "Jericho" – 3:26
 "Love or Money" – 4:50

Personnel
 Joni Mitchell – vocals, guitar, piano, dulcimer, cover photograph and graphics

The L.A. Express
 Tom Scott – woodwind instruments, harmonica
 Robben Ford – electric guitar
 Larry Nash – piano
 Max Bennett – bass
 John Guerin – drums, percussion

Technical
Henry Lewy – sound engineer, mixing
Ken Caillat –  Live Tracking  engineer (for Wally Heiders)
Anthony Hudson – art direction
Mobile Recording: Wally Heider Recording, Ken Caillat
with Jack Crymes, Biff Dawes

Charts

References

External links
 Album liner notes

Joni Mitchell live albums
1974 live albums
Asylum Records live albums